North Redington Beach is a town in Pinellas County, Florida, United States. The population was 1,417 at the 2010 census.

Geography

Demographics

As of the census of 2000, there were 1,474 people, 804 households, and 463 families residing in the town. The racial makeup of the town was 96.81% White, 0.27% African American, 0.27% Native American, 0.95% Asian, 0.20% Pacific Islander, 0.34% from other races, and 1.15% from two or more races. Hispanic or Latino of any race were 3.05% of the population.

There were 804 households, out of which 8.6% had children under the age of 18 living with them, 50.9% were married couples living together, 4.7% had a female householder with no husband present, and 42.3% were non-families. 35.6% of all households were made up of individuals, and 21.5% had someone living alone who was 65 years of age or older. The average household size was 1.83 and the average family size was 2.31.

In the town, the population was spread out, with 8.2% under the age of 18, 2.5% from 18 to 24, 18.0% from 25 to 44, 31.5% from 45 to 64, and 39.8% who were 65 years of age or older. The median age was 58 years. For every 100 females, there were 84.7 males. For every 100 females age 18 and over, there were 83.6 males.

The median income for a household in the town was $46,196, and the median income for a family was $60,855. Males had a median income of $52,206 versus $35,114 for females. The per capita income for the town was $40,066. About 0.9% of families and 4.2% of the population were below the poverty line, including none of those under age 18 and 3.6% of those age 65 or over.

Library

The community is served by the Gulf Beaches Public Library, located in nearby Madeira Beach. The library is supported by Madeira Beach, Redington Beach, North Redington Beach, Redington Shores, and Treasure Island. These five communities have combined their resources in order to fund the library, which they would not be able to maintain individually.

References

External links
 Town of North Redington Beach official website

Towns in Pinellas County, Florida
Towns in Florida
Populated coastal places in Florida on the Gulf of Mexico
Beaches of Pinellas County, Florida
Beaches of Florida